Dakins may refer to:

William Dakins (?–1607), English academic and clergyman, Gresham Professor of Divinity and one of the translators of the King James Bible
, a British frigate commissioned in the Royal Navy in 1943 and scrapped in 1947

See also
Dakin (disambiguation)